Harald Lassen (born 13 March 1987 in Kristiansand, Norway) is a Norwegian jazz musician, composer and band leader. Besides leading the band LASSEN, he has also been a part of bands such as Pixel, Mopti (feat. Bendik Baksaas on the album Bits & Pieces), No. 4, Dr. Kay And His Interstellar Tone Scientists and DUPLEX. He was picked up at an early age by legendary musicians such as bass player Arild Andersen and drummer Jon Christensen. In recent years he has played with musicians such as Bugge Wesseltoft, Morten Qvenild, Emilie Stoesen Christensen, Tord Gustavsen, Bram De Looze, Corrie Dick, Arthur Kay, Ellen Andrea Wang, Anja Lauvdal, Rob Waring, Mathias Eick, Ray Phiri, Mohamed Issa Matona and LABtrio.

Career 

Harald Lassen was raised in Greipstad, Songdalen. He learned how to play the saxophone after many years of playing the piano. He attended the Toneheim Folkehøgskole from 2006 to 2007, the Universitetet i Agder - Institutt for rytmisk musikk from 2007 to 2008, and did further studies in jazz and improvised music at the Norwegian Academy of Music from 2008 to 2012.

Lassen has worked with African musicians and dancers in Kenya, Tanzania, Ethiopia, Mozambique and Uganda. In 2013 Lassen moved to Zanzibar for three months to teach and build up a jazz department for young music students at Dhow Countries Music Academy.

Lassen is currently a board member of Oslo Jazzfestival (2015).

Honors 
2012: "This year's young jazz musicians", the Jazzintro award at Moldejazz, within Mopti
2013: Featured at Young Nordic Jazz Comets within Pixel

Discography 

 2019: LASSEN feat various artists - Remix-Eventyr (Jazzland Recordings)
 2018: LASSEN - Eventyrer (Jazzland Recordings)
 2016: Harald Lassen & Lab Trio - Rainbow Session (Hagen Recordings)
 2019: No. 4 - Duell (Samkjørt)
 2018: Matonas Afdhal Group - Matonas Afdhal Group (OK World)
 2017: No. 4 - Hva Nå (Arch Rec)
 2016: No. 4 - Henda i været (Arch Rec)
 2015: Pixel - Golden Years (Cuneiform Records)
 2015: Mopti - Bits & Pieces (Jazzland Recordings), feat. Bendik Baksaas
 2015: Duplex - Èn (NorCD)
 2014: Sjøen - Live 1 (Havtorn Records)
 2013: Mopti - Logic (Jazzland Recordings)
 2013: Pixel -  We Are All Small Pixels (Cuneiform Records)
 2013: Duplex - Duolia (NorCD)
 2013: Duplex - Sketches Of … (NorCD)
 2013: Andrea Kvintett - Russian Dream (NorCD)
 2013: Dr Kay And His Interstellar Tone Scientists - Dr. Kay and the search for true happiness (Brass&Bangle)
 2012: Pixel -  Reminder (Cuneiform Records)
 2012: Ronja - Il Calebrone (Havtorn Records)
 2012: Bendik Baksaas - The Shape of Beats To Come (Dayladore Collective), feat. on «Nobody Will Laugh»
 2012: Andrea Kvintett - Andrea Kvintett (NorCD)
 2010: Martin Rane Bauck - Suite For A Distant Present Time (Bauckstadt)
 2009: Team Båt - På Lag (Mudi)

References

External links 

Norwegian Academy of Music alumni
Avant-garde jazz musicians
Norwegian jazz saxophonists
Norwegian jazz composers
Male jazz composers
NorCD artists
Cuneiform Records artists
Jazzland Recordings (1997) artists
Musicians from Vest-Agder
1987 births
Living people
21st-century saxophonists
21st-century Norwegian male musicians
Mopti (band) members
Pixel (band) members